Shatrovo may refer to:
Shatrovo, Bulgaria, a village in the Municipality of Bobov Dol, Kyustendil Province, Bulgaria
Shatrovo, Russia, name of several rural localities in Russia